Potrikrom is a small town located in Ahafo-Ano in the Ashanti region of Ghana.

References 

Populated places in the Ashanti Region